Stomopteryx lacteolella is a moth of the family Gelechiidae. It was described by Turati in 1924. It is found in North Africa.

References

Moths described in 1924
Stomopteryx